The Chosen: The Hidden History of Admission and Exclusion at Harvard, Yale, and Princeton is a 2005 book by Jerome Karabel.

External links
 Getting In: The social logic of Ivy League admissions

Chosen
Chosen
Chosen
Chosen
Chosen